Dolwen railway station was a station to the southwest of Llandinam, Powys, Wales. The station was opened in 1859 and closed in 1963. The station building is now a private residence.

References

Further reading

Disused railway stations in Powys
Railway stations in Great Britain opened in 1859
Railway stations in Great Britain closed in 1962
Former Cambrian Railway stations